for the author Colin Shepherd, see Josephine Trott

Sir Colin Ryley Shepherd (born 13 January 1938) is a British Conservative politician. He was MP for Hereford from October 1974 until his defeat by Liberal Democrat Paul Keetch in May 1997.

He was knighted in the 1996 New Year Honours List and lives at Ganarew Manor, Herefordshire.

Notes

References
 "Times Guide to the House of Commons", Times Newspapers Limited, 1997 edition

External links 
 

Conservative Party (UK) MPs for English constituencies
Knights Bachelor
Living people
1938 births
Politics of Herefordshire
UK MPs 1974–1979
UK MPs 1979–1983
UK MPs 1983–1987
UK MPs 1987–1992
UK MPs 1992–1997
Politicians awarded knighthoods
People educated at Oundle School